The 1918–19 Boston College men's ice hockey season was the 2nd season of play for the program.

Season
With the end of World War I coming in November 1918, some colleges restarted their ice hockey programs. Even them, most only played a handful of games so the young program at Boston College was still only able to schedule three matches. The highlight for the year was BC's first match against the top program from Harvard. Because the Boston Arena had been damaged by a fire just before the season began, the teams were forced to play at the much smaller Charlesbank Rink.

Note: Boston College's athletic programs weren't known as the 'Eagles' until 1920.

Roster

Standings

Schedule and Results

|-
!colspan=12 style=";" | Regular Season

References

Boston College Eagles men's ice hockey seasons
Boston College
Boston College
Boston College
Boston College